The Department of Commerce and Agriculture was an Australian government department that existed between December 1942 and January 1956.

Scope
Information about the department's functions and/or government funding allocation could be found in the Administrative Arrangements Orders, the annual Portfolio Budget Statements and in the Department's annual reports.

At the department's creation it was responsible for:
Agriculture Production
Agricultural Economics
Assistance to Primary Producers
Australian Agricultural Council
Collection and dissemination of commercial intelligence and general information
Contact with State Departments of Agriculture regarding agricultural production
Contact with the following organization and administration of any Commonwealth Acts under which they are established:
Australian Apple and Pear Advisory Council
Australian Apple and Pear Marketing Board
Australian Barley Board
Australian Canned Fruits Board
Australian Citrus Advisory Council
Australian Dairy Produce Board
Australian Hides and Leather Industries Board
Australian Meat Board  
Australian National Publicity Association
Australian Potato Board
Australian Tobacco Board
Australian Wheat Board
Australian Wine Board
Australian Wool Board
Australian Wool Realization Commission
Commonwealth Food Control
Council for the Australian Pig Industry
Dairy Produce Control Committee
Dried Fruits Control Board
Egg Producer's Council
Federal Potato Advisory Committee
Field Peas Board
Meat Canning Committee
Meat Industry Advisory Committee
Standing Committee on Agriculture
Superphosphate Industry Committee
Wheat Industry Stabilization Board
Wheat Stabilization Advisory Committee
Eastern Trade Advisory Committee
Exhibitions (organization of trade exhibits)
External Trade - Overseas trade promotion
Fisheries - Administration of Commonwealth policy and co-ordination of State activities and control of fishing in extra-Territorial waters 
General Trade inquiries
Investigation of overseas trade matters
Inspection and/or grading of dairy produce, meat, fruit (fresh, dried and canned), jams, honey, vegetables, etc., exported from the Commonwealth
Investigation of marketing, economic and other problems of farming industries
Marketing investigations abroad
Rural credits
Rural man-power
Tourist publicity abroad
Trade Agreements-
Administration of export aspects
Collaboration with other Departments in negotiations
Trade Commissioner Service
Trade publicity and advertising in Australia, the United Kingdom and elsewhere
Trade Surveys for specific commodities
Published Overseas Trading

Structure
The Department was a Commonwealth Public Service department, staffed by officials who were responsible to the Minister for Commerce and Agriculture.

Subsequent agencies

Department of Primary Industry (11 January 1956 – 2 June 1974)
Department of Agriculture (12 June 1974 – 22 December 1975)
Department of Primary Industry (22 December 1975 – 24 July 1987)
Department of Primary Industries and Energy (24 July 1987 – 21 October 1998)
Department of Agriculture, Fisheries and Forestry (21 October 1998 – 18 September 2013)
Department of Agriculture (18 September 2013 – 21 September 2015)
Department of Agriculture and Water Resources (21 September 2015 – 29 May 2019)

Notable people
Sir John Crawford, Secretary of the department in the 1950s

References

Commerce and Agriculture
Australia, Commerce and Agriculture
Department of Agriculture, Fisheries and Forestry